is a 1967 Japanese film directed by Kihachi Okamoto.

Plot 
A nerdy young college instructor named Shinji Kikyo returns home one day to find himself the target of a mad assassin. Surviving somewhat miraculously, he fends off other assassins and, with the help of the reporter Keiko Tsurumaki and the car mechanic Bill Otomo, eventually discovers that a "population control" association is really an assassination squad led by Shogo Mizorogi, who has been training patients in a mental asylum to become killers. Along the way, it starts to appear that Shinji may not be the mild-mannered academic he seemed at first, but a well-trained secret agent.

Cast

Release
The Age of Assassins was released in Japan on February 4, 1967. The film was released in the United States by Toho International with an international title of Epoch of Murder Madness in 1967.

Reception
The critic Chris Desjardins has written that "Age of Assassins is another sharp-edged lampoon that works just as well as an action film, and compares favorably with such other brilliant, tongue-in-cheek mod sixties masterpieces as Elio Petri's The Tenth Victim and Seijun Suzuki's Branded to Kill."

References

Footnotes

Sources

External links

Japanese black-and-white films
Toho films
1960s Japanese films